The mahoe stripper or green mahoe moth (Feredayia graminosa) is a moth of the family Noctuidae. It is endemic to New Zealand. This moth was first described by Francis Walker in 1857 as Erana graminosa.

Adults are on wing from October to January.

The larvae feed on the leaves of the native mahoe tree, Melicytus ramiflorus.

Feredayia graminosa is a known host of species within the fly genus Pales.

References

External links

Citizen Science observations of Feredayia graminosa

Hadeninae
Moths of New Zealand
Moths described in 1857
Endemic fauna of New Zealand
Taxa named by Francis Walker (entomologist)
Endemic moths of New Zealand